Anchu Sundarikal is a 1968 Indian Malayalam-language film, directed by M. Krishnan Nair and produced by Kasim. The film stars Prem Nazir, Jayabharathi, Adoor Bhasi and Pappukutty Bhagavathar. The film had musical score by M. S. Baburaj.

Cast
Prem Nazir
Jayabharathi
Adoor Bhasi
Pappukutty Bhagavathar
T. S. Muthaiah
G. K. Pillai
Pankajavalli
Paravoor Bharathan
Rani Chandra
Udaya Chandrika

Soundtrack
The music was composed by M. S. Baburaj and the lyrics were written by Yusufali Kechery.

References

External links
 

1968 films
1960s Malayalam-language films
Films directed by M. Krishnan Nair